Bohr is a lunar impact crater that is located near the western lunar limb, in the area that is affected by librations. It is attached to the southwestern rim of the larger, eroded Vasco da Gama formation, and to the southeast of the crater Einstein. The crater was observed for the first time in 1963, by Arthus and Ewen Whitaker in the book Rectified Lunar Atlas.

The rim of Bohr is worn and eroded, and a pair of small, bowl-shaped craters lies across the western rim. The rim to the northeast has been shored up by the adjacent Vasco da Gama, but the remainder forms an irregular ring of rugged ground. To the southwest of Bohr is Vallis Bohr, a valley trending in a north–south direction. This long cleft is most likely associated with the formation of the Mare Orientale farther to the south.

References

 
 
 
 
 
 
 
 
 
 
 
 

Impact craters on the Moon